You Gotta Eat Here! was a Canadian food television series that aired from January 2012 until December 2016 on Food Network Canada. Produced by Lone Eagle Entertainment, the program was hosted by comedian John Catucci.

The show featured Catucci on a tour to discover great restaurants (three per episode). He visited restaurants ranging from greasy spoons to legendary locations to taste the food that made them famous and to meet the characters that make them institutions. Catucci also explored the kitchens to reveal their signature recipes. Most episodes focused on restaurants in Canada or the United States, although Catucci also sometimes visited restaurants in Europe for special themed episodes.

The series won two Canadian Screen Awards, for Best Lifestyle or Talk Program or Series and Best Direction in a Lifestyle/Practical Information Program or Series, at the 2nd Canadian Screen Awards in 2014. It also garnered nominations at the 3rd Canadian Screen Awards in 2015 for Best Lifestyle or Talk Program or Series and Best Direction in a Lifestyle/Practical Information Program or Series.

On June 15, 2017, Food Network Canada announced the cancellation of the series after five seasons.

References

External links
 
 You Gotta Eat Here! at Food Network Canada

2010s Canadian reality television series
2012 Canadian television series debuts
Food Network (Canadian TV channel) original programming
Food travelogue television series
Canadian travel television series
Television series by Corus Entertainment
2010s Canadian cooking television series